Sailing La Vagabonde is a YouTube channel run by Australian video bloggers Riley Whitelum and Elayna Carausu. The channel documents the couple's life aboard their sailing catamaran La Vagabonde. , the channel had over 1.79 million subscribers and is the most popular sailing YouTube channel. In November 2019, they received significant media attention for sailing Greta Thunberg onboard La Vagabonde from Virginia to Lisbon for the 2019 United Nations Climate Change Conference in Madrid.

History
The channel was founded in 2014 after Whitelum and Carausu met in Greece. The couple sustains their sailing by producing a weekly video blog on YouTube that is also funded by income from the crowdfunding web site Patreon. The series began aboard their Beneteau Cyclades sailboat. Following the success of their channel, they negotiated a discounted price with the company Outremer for the catamaran that they have sailed since 2017. Between 2014 and 2022, the pair sailed over  combined, including four Atlantic ocean crossings and one Pacific ocean crossing.

References

External links 
 
 

YouTube channels launched in 2014
Sailing
Greta Thunberg
Australian YouTubers
English-language YouTube channels